Devin DeHaven (born February 20, 1970) is an American television director and producer. His career has spanned three decades with hundreds of live concerts, talk shows and music festivals.

Artists 

Partial ist of artists collaborations:

Talk shows 

BEHIND THE RHYME (Executive Producer/Director)
Behind The Rhyme hosted by Kool Moe Dee that features current stars and legends of hip hop in an intimate one on one setting.  The first episode premiered in June 2017 with guest Chuck D.

TOM GREEN LIVE (Producer/Director)
On October 3, 2013, Tom Green Live debuted on AXS TV. The weekly live broadcast, hosted by comedian Tom Green aired at 9pm ET every Thursday night from a studio in Los Angeles. The telecast has a similar format to the web show, with an hour long discussion between Green and his featured guest and live Skype calls from viewers.  Although it was intended for the series to showcase Green's more serious side and highlight his skills as an interviewer, he has advised viewers to expect "spontaneous, ridiculous, and outrageous conversations". Guests have included Richard Belzer, Howie Mandel and Tony Hawk. Season 2 debuted on January 9, 2014, and the finale was April 3, 2014. The show was renewed with season 3 debuting on June 12, 2014, with guest Steve Carell.

KOBE UP CLOSE (Director)
On August 15, 2013 AXS TV broadcast a live interview program of Los Angeles Laker legend Kobe Bryant hosted by Jimmy Kimmel.  The program was a charity event for The Kobe and Vanessa Bryant Family Foundation and Cedars-Sinai Medical Center's Sports Spectacular and featured a one-hour, in depth interview on his long career in the NBA.

TWITCH
EP of BEHIND THE RHYME on twitch.  Behind the Rhyme is a leading hip hop site on Twitch featuring the biggest acts in hip hop from all era's.

References

External links 
 
 http://www.devindehaven.com
 http://www.fortress.la

American television directors
1970 births
Living people